Martin Campbell (born 24 October 1943) is a New Zealand film and television director based in the United Kingdom. He is known for having directed The Mask of Zorro as well as the James Bond films GoldenEye and Casino Royale. He won a BAFTA for his direction of the 1985 television serial Edge of Darkness.

Life and career
Born in Hastings, New Zealand, Campbell moved to London, where he began his career as a director of softcore sex comedies and action television series in the 1970s. He went on to direct two James Bond films, 1995's GoldenEye, starring Pierce Brosnan, and 2006's Casino Royale, starring Daniel Craig. At 62 years old, Campbell was the oldest director in the series' history, beating the previous record set by Lewis Gilbert. Campbell stated that he was offered the opportunity to direct further James Bond films after GoldenEye; however, he found the plots to be limiting and only considered directing further films if working with a new Bond actor - as he subsequently did with Daniel Craig on Casino Royale.

He directed two Zorro films: The Mask of Zorro (1998) and The Legend of Zorro (2005), both starring Antonio Banderas and Catherine Zeta-Jones. Campbell also directed the 2011 film adaptation of the DC Comics superhero Green Lantern, as well as The Foreigner (2017), starring Jackie Chan. 

On television, Campbell directed the film Cast a Deadly Spell and oversaw some of the more action-oriented episodes from the TV series The Professionals (1977–1983). However, his best-known work is the 1985 BBC Television drama serial Edge of Darkness, for which he won the British Academy Television Award for Best Director in 1986. Campbell has also directed a 2010 movie remake of Edge of Darkness, starring Mel Gibson and Ray Winstone. Campbell directed the first episode of the US TV series Last Resort.

Unreleased projects
In June 2007, Martin Campbell was in negotiations to replace Robert Schwentke as director of the film, now titled Unstoppable. Campbell was involved until March 2009, when Tony Scott came on board as director. Martin Campbell was chosen to direct Hunter Killer, but, on March 3, 2016, it was announced that Donovan Marsh would direct the film.

Filmography

Films

Television

See also
List of New Zealand film makers

References

External links
 

1943 births
Living people
Action film directors
BAFTA winners (people)
Mountaineering film directors
New Zealand film directors
New Zealand television directors
People from Hastings, New Zealand